The Sanak Islands are a subgroup of the Fox Islands group of islands, located in the Aleutians East Borough of Alaska.

Geography
Located in the Gulf of Alaska, they are in the Aleutian Islands archipelago. The Sanak Islands have a total land area of 157.617 km2 (60.856 sq mi) and are unpopulated.

Caton Island and Sanak Island are the largest islands in the group. Others include small islets which are clustered around Sanak Island.

The islands are covered in native grasses, such as Lyme grass (Leymus arenarius).

See also

References
Sanak Islands: Block 1074, Census Tract 1, Aleutians East Borough, Alaska United States Census Bureau

Fox Islands (Alaska)
Islands of Aleutians East Borough, Alaska
Uninhabited islands of Alaska
Islands of Alaska